Luis Manuel López Santos (born September 4, 1970) is a Puerto Rican former Major League Baseball utility infielder. He is currently the hitting coach for the Greenville Drive, a Single-A affiliate of the Boston Red Sox.

Career
López became a free agent after the  season, but re-signed with the Padres. He made his only postseason appearance in 1996 in the NLDS against the St. Louis Cardinals, but did not get an at bat.

On March 15, 1997, López was traded to the Houston Astros for Sean Runyan, but just 16 days later was traded to the New York Mets for Tim Bogar. On January 21, 2000, he was traded to the Milwaukee Brewers for Bill Pulsipher. After batting .262 in 176 games with the Brewers, he was released on June 7, 2002. Less than a month after signing with the Rochester Red Wings on June 18, his contract was purchased by the Baltimore Orioles on July 12. He batted .211 with two home runs and nine runs batted in in 52 appearances. He was released by the Orioles on October 1. He signed with the Colorado Rockies on December 27, 2002. In 2004, he reappeared in the majors with the Orioles, but became a free agent at the end of the season. On December 29, 2004, López signed with the Cincinnati Reds appearing in 17 games before becoming a free agent after the season and retiring.

References

External links

1970 births
Living people
Atenienses de Manatí (baseball) players
Baltimore Orioles players
Charleston Rainbows players
Cincinnati Reds players
Colorado Springs Sky Sox players
Indianapolis Indians players
Las Vegas Stars (baseball) players
Liga de Béisbol Profesional Roberto Clemente infielders
Louisville Bats players
Major League Baseball players from Puerto Rico
Major League Baseball infielders
Milwaukee Brewers players
Minor league baseball coaches
New York Mets players
Norfolk Tides players
Ottawa Lynx players
People from Cidra, Puerto Rico
Puerto Rican expatriate baseball players in Canada
Riverside Red Wave players
Rochester Red Wings players
San Diego Padres players
Spokane Indians players
Wichita Wranglers players